"Stabitha Christie" / "First High of the Morning" is a single from Against Me!, released on 7" vinyl on April 22, 2017, on Total Treble Music, as a limited edition for Record Store Day 2017. Unlike previous Record Store Day releases by Against Me!, the single was released digitally on May 26, 2017.

The songs are both b-sides from the Shape Shift with Me recording sessions.

Track listing

Personnel
 Laura Jane Grace – lead vocals, guitar
 James Bowman – guitar, backing vocals
 Inge Johansson – bass, backing vocals 
 Atom Willard – drums, percussion
 TBC – violin (track 2)

References

2017 songs
2017 singles
Against Me! songs
Songs written by Laura Jane Grace